The Seven Madmen (also known as The Revolution of the Seven Madmen) is a 1973 Argentine drama film directed by Leopoldo Torre Nilsson and starring Alfredo Alcón, Norma Aleandro and Héctor Alterio. It was based on the novels Los siete locos (The Seven Madmen) and Los lanzallamas (The Flamethowers), by Roberto Arlt. The film was entered into the 23rd Berlin International Film Festival, where it won the Silver Bear Award.

Cast
Alfredo Alcón as Erdosain
Norma Aleandro as Hipólita
Héctor Alterio as Gregorio Barsut
Thelma Biral as Elsa
Sergio Renán as El Rufián Melancólico
José Slavin as Alberto
Osvaldo Terranova as Ángel Erqueta
Leonor Manso
Lilian Riera
Luis Politti
Noemí Granata
Oscar Pedemonti
Saul Jarlip
Jorge Povarché
Mario Nervi
Laura Conte

References

External links 
 

1973 films
Argentine drama films
1970s Spanish-language films
1973 drama films
Films directed by Leopoldo Torre Nilsson
1970s Argentine films